Leidig is a surname. Notable people with the surname include:

Charles J. Leidig (born 1956), American military commander
Michael Leidig (born 1965), British journalist
Sabine Leidig (born 1961), German politician

German-language surnames